Odontolabis delesserti is a quite rare species of beetles of the family Lucanidae.

Description
In the males the head is large, with large jaws. The head and the pronotum are dark brown, while elytra are shiny and yellowish, with a triangular dark brown marking.

Distribution
Odontolabis delesserti is found only in southwestern India.

References

  Zipcodezoo

External links
 Online Insect Museum
  Odontolabis delesserti

Lucaninae
Beetles described in 1843
Odontolabis
Insects of India